Mimipiscis is a fossil genus of very primitive ray-finned fishes from the Upper Devonian Gneudna and Gogo Formations of Western Australia.

The genus was initially described by Gardiner & Bartram as Mimia in 1977, a junior homonym of the skipper butterfly genus Mimia which was already established by Evans in 1953.

See also

 Prehistoric fish
 List of prehistoric bony fish

References

Prehistoric ray-finned fish genera
Late Devonian animals
Late Devonian fish
Devonian bony fish
Junior homonyms
Gogo fauna